The 306th Infantry Division was an infantry division of the German Wehrmacht during World War II.

History 
The 306th Infantry Division was formed on 15 November 1940 as a static division of the 13th Aufstellungswelle in the Hamm area in Wehrkreis VI. The division's initial recruitment pool came from a third each of the 86th and the 291st Infantry Divisions, as well as the Field Recruit Battalion 129. The initial commander of the 306th Infantry Division was Hans von Sommerfeld.

After deployment was fully completed by May 1941, the 306th Infantry Division served in occupied Belgium until the winter of 1942 to 1943. On 12 March 1942, the division gave parts of its manpower to the newly formed 371st Infantry Division of the 19th Aufstellungswelle. On 17 July 1942, the previously incomplete Artillery Regiment 306 was completed with three additional artillery batteries to prepare for the impending deployment to the Eastern Front. On 21 October 1942, the 306th Infantry Division received orders to be restructured from a static division to an assault division. The restructuring was undertaken in November.

On 1 November 1942, the divisional commander was replaced by Georg Neymann and transported to the Eastern Front later that month. On 2 November 1943, the division fought in the area between Kremenchug and Dnjepropetrovsk on the west bank of the Dnieper and suffered heavy losses. The division was refreshed by the dissolved 328th Infantry Division, receiving from the 328th the Division Group 328, the Fusilier Battalion 328, the 2nd and 4th batteries of Artillery Regiment 328, and the Field Replacement Battalion and logistics troops Simultaneously, the third battalions of each of the three regiments of the 306th Infantry Division were dissolved to supply the newly formed 353rd Infantry Division.

Over the year of 1943, divisional commanders of the 306th Infantry Division included, among others, Georg Pfeiffer, Theo-Helmut Lieb, and Carl-Erik Koehler. On 4 July 1944, the fourth detachment of Artillery Regiment 306 (officially designated the fourth detachment of Artillery Regiment 328) was replaced by the third detachment of Artillery Regiment 117 from the 111th Infantry Division.
On 24 July 1944, the Division Group 328 became the Grenadier Regiment 549.

By April 1944, the division had retreated to the west bank of the Dniester. 
In August 1944, the division was destroyed on the first day of the Second Jassy–Kishinev offensive, while serving under Army Group South Ukraine. It was formally dissolved on 9 October 1944.

Organization

Superior formations

Subordinate formations 
At the point of formation in late 1940, the 306th Infantry Division consisted of the following parts:

 Infantry Regiment 579 (three battalions).
 Infantry Regiment 580 (three battalions).
 Infantry Regiment 581 (three battalions).
 Artillery Regiment 306 (three detachments).

In late 1943, the division was restructured into a Type 1944 Infantry Division. After this restructuring, it consisted of the following parts:

 Grenadier Regiment 579 (two battalions).
 Grenadier Regiment 580 (two battalions).
 Division Group 328 with Regiment Groups 548 and 549.
 Division Group 328.
 Regiment Group 548.
 Regiment Group 549.
 Division Fusilier Battalion 328.
 Artillery Regiment 306 (four detachments).

Divisional commanders 

 Hans von Sommerfeld, divisional commander of the 306th Infantry Division (15 November 1940 – 1 November 1942).
 Georg Neymann, divisional commander of the 306th Infantry Division (1 November 1942 – November 1942).
 Gerhard Matthias, divisional commander of the 306th Infantry Division (November 1942 – 29 January 1943).
 Georg Pfeiffer, divisional commander of the 306th Infantry Division (29 January 1943 – 21 February 1943).
 Theo-Helmut Lieb, divisional commander of the 306th Infantry Division (21 February 1943 – 30 March 1943).
 Carl-Erik Koehler, divisional commander of the 306th Infantry Division (30 March 1943 – 1 January 1944).
 Karl Baer, divisional commander of the 306th Infantry Division (1 January 1944 – 13 January 1944).
 Carl-Erik Koehler, divisional commander of the 306th Infantry Division (13 January 1944 – 20 April 1944).

Notes

References 

Infantry divisions of Germany during World War II
Military units and formations established in 1940
Military units and formations disestablished in 1944